Takayus chikunii is a species of comb-footed spider in the family Theridiidae. It is found in China and Japan.

References

Theridiidae
Spiders described in 1960
Spiders of Asia